Druceiella is a genus of moths of the family Hepialidae. There are four described species, although a revision of the genus is being carried out which will add at least four new species. The current species are all found in South America.

Males of this genus are unusual in having an asymmetric extension at the end of the abdomen.

The genus was named in honour of the entomologist Herbert Druce (1846–1913).

Species
Druceiella amazonensis – Brazil
Druceiella basirubra – Bolivia/Peru
Druceiella metellus – Ecuador
Druceiella momus – Ecuador

External links
Hepialidae genera

Hepialidae
Taxa named by Pierre Viette
Exoporia genera